The following is a list of Teen Choice Award winners and nominees for Choice Electronic/Dance Artist.

Winners and nominees

2010s

References

Electronic/Dance Artist